The U.S. and the Holocaust is a 2022 three-part documentary miniseries about the United States' response to the Holocaust. The series was directed by Ken Burns, Lynn Novick, and Sarah Botstein, and was written by frequent Burns collaborator Geoffrey C. Ward.

The miniseries premiered on PBS on September 18, 20, and 21, 2022 and has since then been available to stream on PBS.org and the PBS video app.

History and production 
The miniseries was partially inspired by the United States Holocaust Memorial Museum's "Americans and the Holocaust" exhibition and Burns' production of it coincided with the ongoing exhibit. Work on the miniseries began in 2015, after Burns and Novick received questions about the American response to the Holocaust following the release of Burns’ documentaries The War and The Roosevelts: An Intimate History.

Voice actors and narrators for the miniseries include Liam Neeson, Matthew Rhys, Paul Giamatti, Meryl Streep, Werner Herzog, Joe Morton and Hope Davis.

Synopsis 

The miniseries begins in 1933, covering the national culture of the U.S. before World War II and the Holocaust, including topics such as antisemitism, racism, the eugenics movement and how Nazi Germany used Jim Crow laws in the American South as models for its own racial policy, including the Nuremberg Laws and other pieces of antisemitic legislation. 

Through interviews with Holocaust survivors, historians and witnesses, as well as through historical footage, the series examines the U.S. response to the rise of Adolf Hitler and the Holocaust. The miniseries ends with footage of recent events in the U.S., including the 2015 Charleston church shooting, the 2017 Unite the Right rally, the 2018 Pittsburgh synagogue shooting and the 2021 January 6 United States Capitol attack.

Episodes 

The original airing of Episodes 2 and 3 was postponed for one day in honor of the funeral of Queen Elizabeth II on September 19.

Release 
The U.S. and the Holocaust was shown at the 2022 Telluride Film Festival, which Burns has frequently attended. To promote the film’s release, PBS held in-person and virtual roundtable discussions with film director Steven Spielberg, author Michael Abramowitz, CNN anchor Jake Tapper, the International Rescue Committee and Freedom House.

In the UK, The U.S. and the Holocaust was released on BBC Four weekly from January 9, 2023, with all episodes dropping on the BBC's iPlayer streaming service.

Reception 
The U.S. and the Holocaust was received overwhelmingly positively by critics. As of October 2022, it has a 100% rating on film review aggregator Rotten Tomatoes. John Berman of CNN's New Day on September 15, 2022 called the series "breathtaking."

Pulitzer Prize winning journalist Dorothy Rabinowitz of Wall Street Journal wrote that the series was "sublime" and "shined a light on political aspects" of the Holocaust "never before addressed in a TV documentary." 

Matthew Gilbert of The Boston Globe wrote, "Compelling, and delivered by a series of articulate historians."

References

External links
 
 
 
 

2022 films
2022 documentary films
Documentary films about United States history
Documentary films about the Holocaust
Films directed by Ken Burns
American documentary films
Documentary films about immigration to the United States
Films about Franklin D. Roosevelt
Documentary films about refugees